Centrolepis mutica is a species of plant in the Restionaceae family and is found in Western Australia.

It blooms between November and December producing green flowers.

It is found in winter wet areas along the west coast in the Wheatbelt, South West and Peel regions of Western Australia where it grows in sandy-clay soils.

References

mutica
Plants described in 1873
Flora of Western Australia
Poales of Australia